

The Dietrich DP.VII  was a 1920s German two-seat touring monoplane designed by Richard Dietrich and built by the Dietrich Flugzeugwerke in Kassel, Germany.

Development
The DP.VII was a low-wing braced monoplane powered by a Haacke lightweight flat-two piston engine. A training variant the DP.VIIa had a larger Siemens-Halske radial engine.

Specifications

References

Notes

Bibliography

1920s German civil utility aircraft
Low-wing aircraft